Anatol Rosenfeld (28 August 1912 – 11 December 1973) was a German-Brazilian philosopher and art critic. In 1937, as a Jew fleeing Nazism, Anatol Rosenfeld emigrated to Brazil and died there, in 1973.

In Brazil, Rosenfeld is a noted scholar for his work on Bertold Brecht and epic theater. He taught in the University of São Paulo from 1962 to his death.

Sources
 
 

1912 births
1973 deaths
German art critics
Jewish emigrants from Nazi Germany to Brazil
20th-century Brazilian philosophers
Jewish Brazilian writers
Jewish philosophers
Academic staff of the University of São Paulo
German male non-fiction writers